Thierry Malet, is a French composer of film music. He is also the designer of the very first MIDI guitars and a new 3D spatialization system for feature film music.

Life and career 
Thierry Malet started to study the piano at the age of 7 at the Conservatoire of Paris with the pianist and concertist Marie-Claire Laroche, where he took courses in harmony and composition. But it was to be a further ten years before he discovered his true passion at Claude Bolling's school, writing film scores. In order to gain a fuller understanding of musical acoustics, he went to study acoustics at the Conservatoire National des Arts et Métiers.

In 1986, he developed the very first MIDI digital guitar in Belgium with the RTBF laboratories. before moving to the Sheffield University in England where he graduated with a Ph.D. in bioacoustics  and architectural acoustic computer simulation. Confident in this experience, he returned to France in 1994 and was soon to compose a number of original scores for television broadcasts and documentaries before going on to sign scores for French and American feature films. In 1995, he founded his own executive musical production company in order to gain a perfect understanding of the recording business.

In 2005, he signed the original score of the musical film Imago which won the Golden Rail at the Cannes film festival | Semaine de la critique. He won the SACEM prize for the best film score.

Latest events 
In 2015, he composed the music of the film Winter Roses directed by Lorenzo Gabriele with Jean-Pierre Marielle, Mylène Demongeot and Léa Drucker.

In 2016, he signed the music of a big show at the Grand Palais in Paris (France), The Conquest of the Air, a full 360° 6000 m2 picture with a 3D music as a tribute to the 100 years anniversary of the French aviation.

In 2017, he attended a press conference at the Cannes Film Festival in the south of France where he announced the release of a new 3D system of spatialization called ARPEGAM and dedicated to the recording of feature film music.

Selected filmography [Original titles in french] 

 2020 : Luca directed by Horatiu Malaele and written by Adrian Lustig
 2020 : Tijuana Bible directed by Jean-Charles Hue
 2019 : Haroun Tazieff directed by Eric Beauducel
 2019 : Paul-Emile Victor directed by Stephane Dugast
 2019 : Europe, Pushed to the wall directed by Nicolas Dupuis
 2018 : Voices from the Stones directed by Eric Beauducel
 2017 : La nuit aux invalides directed by Bruno Sellier
 2017 : Journal d'une crue directed by Eric Beauducel
 2016 : [The Conquest of the Air] directed by Bruno Seillier
 2016 : Qui sème l'amour... directed by Lorenzo Gabriele with Julie de Bona
 2015 : The eye of the storm directed by Sékou Traoré and Luis Marques
 2015 : Des roses en hiver directed by Lorenzo Gabriele with Jean-Pierre Marielle
 2015 : Pater Noster directed by Eddy Vicken and Yvon Bertorello
 2015 : Haroun Tazieff / Claude Allègre – La guerre des volcans directed by Éric Beauducel
 2014 : Le petit Houdini directed by Cédric Babouche
 2014 : 1910: Paris sous les eaux directed by Olivier Poujaud and Éric Beauducel
 2014 : Ils font dans la dentelle directed by Valérie Jourdan and Éric Beauducel
 2013 : L’Echange directed by Michael Mongin and Jérôme Léonard
 2013 : Starcraf Les ailes de la liberté - Trailer
 2013 : Le Lagon directed by Éric Beauducel (IMAX – 3D)
 2013 : Luminescence directed by Bruno Seillier (3D)
 2013 : Femmes de silence directed by Eddy Vicken
 2013 : Une justice entre deux mondes directed by Éric Beauducel
 2013 : Prêtre pour se donner directed by Véronique Brechot
 2012 : Au nom du frère directed by Éric Beauducel
 2012 : Cathologue directed by Aymeric Christensen
 2012 : Gainesville, Dios Primeramente directed by Éric Beauducel
 2011 : Comme chez soi directed by Lorenzo Gabriele
 2011 : Pierre et l’Emmanuel directed by Bernard Simon and Éric Beauducel
 2010 : Walpole, l'île mystérieuse directed by Éric Beauducel
 2010 : Le Pigeon directed by Lorenzo Gabriele with François Morel and Thierry Lhermitte
 2009 : Those Special Men directed by Eddy Vicken and Yvon Bertorello
 2009 : Le Mont Athos directed by Yvon Bertorello and Eddy Vicken
 2009 : Tragédie Grouick directed by Matthieu Van Eeckhout and Marc Earcersall
 2008 : La mascarade des Makhishis directed by Jérôme Ségur
 2008 : Frères de sang directed by Bernard Simon
 2008 : Moussa à Paris directed by Maka Sidibé
 2007 : Mister French Taste directed by Benoît Proux and Eric Beauducel
 2007 : Notable donc coupable directed by Francis Girod
 2006 : Allez de l’avant directed by Éric Beauducel
 2005 : Parlez-moi d’amour directed by Lorenzo Gabriele
 2005 : Imago directed by Cédric Babouche
 2004 : Vous êtes de la région directed by Lionel Epp
 2004 : Le bataillon des guitaristes directed by Éric Beauducel
 2004 : Aligato directed by Maka Sidibé
 2003 : Je hais les enfants directed by Lorenzo Gabriele
 2003 : Les femmes ont toujours raison directed by Élisabeth Rappeneau
 2003 : L’Alexandrophagie directed by Sylvain Gillet
 2003 : Nuit d’Amour directed by Ron Dyens
 2003 : La famille Barbecuche directed by Lorenzo Gabriele
 2002 : Third base directed by Thomas Goupille
 2002 : Le Prix de la mort directed by Thomas Goupille
 2002 : Le hasard fait bien les choses directed by Lorenzo Gabriele
 2002 : Volutes directed by Romain Clément
 2001 : Riffed (en) directed by Lorenzo Gabriele
 2001 : L’Héritier directed by Christian Karcker
 2001 : Appel d’air directed by Armault Labaronne
 2000 : Parking directed by Christophe Stupar
 2000 : La dernière femme directed by Benoît Proux
 2000 : Volcans sous surveillance directed by Éric Beauducel
 2000 : Le siège des Dieux directed by Éric Beauducel
 1999 : Chuut directed by Christophe Legendre
 1999 : Le feu qui nourrit directed by Éric Beauducel
 1998 : Le Morbihan, vents et marées directed by Nicolas Mifsud
 1998 : La sagesse sous les hêtres directed by Éric Beauducel
 1998 : Vingt ans Veneur directed by Éric Beauducel
 1998 : Vents et marées directed by Éric Beauducel
 1998 : Le Finistère directed by David Teyssandier
 1998 : A la recherche du Tassergal directed by Éric Beauducel
 1998 : Côte d’Opale directed by Isabelle Saunois
 1998 : Surfcasting sous les falaises Normandes directed by Nicolas Mifsud
 1998 : Charentes, vents et marées directed by Isabelle Saunois
 1998 : Ile d’Yeu de Père en fils directed by Éric Beauducel
 1998 : La chasse saison II directed by Éric Beauducel
 1998 : Une femme parmi les hommes directed by Isabelle Saunois
 1998 : Surf en mer Baltique directed by Jérôme Colin
 1998 : Delta de l’Ebre – Espagne directed by Éric Beauducel
 1998 : La manche, vents et marées directed by Nicolas Mifsud
 1998 : Surfcasting dans les Pertuis directed by David Teyssandier
 1997 : Eiffel et sa tour directed by Claire Jenteur
 1997 : Les transportés'' directed by Éric Beauducel
 1997 : L’aventure d’Alexandre Le Grand directed by Jean-Phlippe Quillien
 1997 : La chasse saison I, Série de 6 documentaires directed by Éric Beauducel
 1997 : Un territoire en Sologne directed by Véronique Klener and Éric Beauducel
 1997 : Un poète dans la garrigue directed by Isabelle Saunois
 1997 : La pêche à la Dorade Royale directed by Éric Beauducel
 1997 : Transair (Grand prix du Festival de Biarritz)
 1996 : Mafa Africain directed by Bernard Simon
 1996 : Einstein et son temps directed by Daniel Garric
 1995 : Une vie donnée directed by Yves Humbert
 1994 : Les Chansonniers directed by Bernard Simon

References

External links 
 Official website
 

1964 births
Living people
French composers
Conservatoire de Paris alumni